Barnabas Suebu (born 29 April 1945) also known as Bas Suebu, is an Indonesian politician. He was the governor of the Indonesian province of Papua for two periods: 1988–1993 and 2006–2011. He wants to protect the province's forests, and has made plans to declare a moratorium on log exports and recommended that no new logging concessions be granted to timber companies. Suebu appeared on Time magazine's list of Heroes of the Environment October 2007.

Early life, education, and career
Barnabas Suebu was born on 29 April 1945 in Sentani, Papua, to Bonifasius Suebu and Salomi Monim. Suebu obtained a Bachelor of Laws at Cenderawasih University in 1988. He was also a graduate from National Resilience Institute (Lemhanas) in 1984.

He was the chairman of Irian Jaya KNPI (Indonesian Youth National Committee) in 1974 and 1975, speaker of Irian Jaya Legislative Assembly (1987–1988), adviser to the Minister for Research and Technology, a member of Congress (1997–2002) and Indonesian ambassador to Mexico, Honduras and Panama (1999–2002).

Personal life
Suebu is married and has six children.

References

1945 births
Governors of Papua (province)
Indonesian Christians
Living people
Papuan people
Cenderawasih University alumni